Samurai Gourmet is a twelve-part 2017 Japanese-language web television series on Netflix, based on Masayuki Kusumi's essay and the manga of the same title. The premise revolves around Takeshi Kasumi (Naoto Takenaka), told in a slice of life style. Now a retired salaryman, Kasumi discovers the joys of eating and drinking, which awakens his inner persona — a wandering samurai living freely in Japan's age of civil wars.

Cast
 Naoto Takenaka as Takeshi Kasumi
 Tetsuji Tamayama as Samurai
 Honami Suzuki as Shizuko

Episodes

Release
Samurai Gourmet has been released on Netflix streaming.

References

External links
 
 
 

Japanese-language television shows
Japanese-language Netflix original programming
Cooking in anime and manga
Television shows set in Tokyo